Sinocanthium is a monotypic genus of east Asian spiders in the family Cheiracanthiidae containing the single species, Sinocanthium shuangqiu. It was first described by J. S. Zhang, H. Yu and S. Q. Li in 2020, and it has only been found in China.

See also
 List of Cheiracanthiidae species

References

Monotypic Cheiracanthiidae genera
Spiders of China